, abbreviated on-screen as NHK E, is the second television service of NHK (Japan Broadcasting Corporation). It is a sister service of NHK General TV, showing programs of a more  educational, cultural or intellectual nature, periodically also showing anime, and also airing programming from Nickelodeon. A similar counterpart would be PBS (Public Broadcasting Service) of the United States (or to a lesser extent BBC Two and BBC Four of the UK). NHK displays a watermark "NHK E" at the upper right for its digital TV broadcast. In 2010, NHK began using the abbreviation .

Overview
Unlike NHK General Television (NHK G), which organizes programs differently for each region, it is based on a unified programming organization throughout Japan, so in the Kanto region, the three Tokai prefectures, and Kinki region, some prefectures broadcast. It is set as a broadcasting area equivalent to the wide area broadcasting of commercial broadcasting without setting . As a result, the number of broadcasting stations that can broadcast independently is 41, which is less than that of NHK General TV.

The structure is generally based on various educational programming, hobbies/liberal arts courses, welfare/entertainment for the disabled, and entertainment for children, but high school baseball is also broadcast. Some of them were once broadcast on NHK General TV, but they have been consolidated due to changes in media.

Since the 2000s, NHK E has been lined up with popular programs that have been softened by renewing individual programs and appointing talents while following the past program structure. For example, "Go/Shogi", "Persons with disabilities", "Classical music", "Language", "Tanka/Haiku", etc. are not only treated purely, but are also made as "cultural programs close to variety shows". The editing of the program also makes heavy use of telops and wipes, and is close to that of commercial broadcasting.

In "Today's Menu", language courses and hobby programs, the promotion of the program text is always inserted at the end of the program. The theme of "Sunday Art Museum" is that special exhibitions are held at museums in Japan, and artists and genres that are timely for industrial use, such as "XX Anniversary", are given priority.

There used to be a 24-hour broadcast, but due to various reasons, it was canceled and the average daily broadcast is around 21 hours. However, with the completion of the digitization principle, efforts are being made to reduce this by utilizing multi-organization , etc., and from 2012, the broadcasting time will be further reduced.

History
The Tokyo station was opened on January 10, 1959 as Japan's first television broadcasting station specializing in educational broadcasting, and the Osaka station was opened on April 1, 1959. Initially, it didn't broadcast all day, being interrupted for several hours during the day and test patterns were played.

Tokyo opened on channel 1 from Tokyo Tower, which was just completed, and on April 6th of the same year, the general and educational channels that were broadcast on channel 3 from the transmission station in Chiyoda Ward (later Chiyoda Broadcasting Center) were replaced. Until then, channel 12 assigned for US military radar was used in Osaka. Even nationwide, there were relatively many areas where 12ch was assigned to analog broadcasting on educational television. Until Educational TV was made available nationwide, some school broadcast programs were broadcast on NHK General TV in areas where only NHK General TV broadcast.

Color broadcasting began around the same time as NHK General TV. According to the NHK Archives program guide search, there is a description [Note 8] in the program "Kacchan" for young children on September 10, 1960, when the main broadcast started, and after September 12, "Science Class" "First grade of elementary school" and "I made it" for young children are broadcast in color in Tokyo.

Due to the influence of the first oil crisis, after January 16, 1974, 1 to 3 hours between 14:30 to 17:30 were used for an interruption, and the midnight broadcast was interrupted, pushing the closing time to 11pm. In 1975, the analog UHF experimental stations in Tokyo and Osaka were closed, and the experimental program "University Course" for the opening of the Open University of Japan will be broadcast. Therefore, the time saving measures due to the oil crisis were completely lifted for the first time in one year, two and a half months.

While the start of colorization of the broadcast itself was around the same time as the NHK General, full-scale colorization of the program wasn't complete even after the consolidation of bases in Tokyo to the broadcasting center in Shibuya was completed in October 1977. Due to this colorization, black-and-white broadcasting excluding reruns of past works has disappeared from Japanese TV programs.

Regarding analog sound multiplex broadcasting, it was first implemented in the three major metropolitan areas from October 1990, and the others from March 21 the following year. Both were considerably slower than NHK General TV and commercial broadcasters in Tokyo and Osaka. Teletext broadcasting (subtitled broadcasting) started later in 1999.

However, with the launch of these services, the restrictions on the organization of educational television gradually decreased. As if to match this movement, some of the genres that had been broadcast comprehensively until then have been transferred to educational television as part of the genre organization, coupled with the start of the main broadcast of satellite television. The children's programs that were broadcast comprehensively disappeared in the Heisei era and were concentrated on educational television. News and information programs began to be organized during the general vacant time slots.

Programs

Onishi Hiroto's Basic English Recipe (大西泰斗の英会話☆定番レシピ) (2021-)
Numbers and Figures (数とかたち) (1977-1984)
The World of Mathematics (数の世界) (1980-1985)
Fun with Math (たのしい算数) (1992-1995)
One, Two, Three, Mathematics (いち、 に、 さん, 数の) (TBA)

NHK domestic stations and Radio 2 / ETV services

References

External links

Educational TV
Educational and instructional television channels
Children's television networks
Education in Japan
Television channels and stations established in 1959
1959 in Japanese television